Norman Myles Kroll (6 April 1922, Tulsa, Oklahoma – 8 August 2004, La Jolla, California) was an American theoretical physicist, known for his pioneering work in QED.

Kroll received in 1942 his bachelor's degree from Columbia University after 2 years of study, having studied from 1938 to 1940 at Rice University in Houston. During WW II he did theoretical radar research (magnetron theory), during 1943–1945, at Columbia under the supervision of Willis Lamb and I. I. Rabi. In 1943 Kroll received his master's degree and in 1948 his PhD from Columbia University with Lamb as thesis advisor.
 

In the academic year 1948–1949 he was a visiting scholar at the Institute for Advanced Study, where he, with Robert Karplus, calculated the QED two-loop contributions for the anomalous magnetic moment of the electron. Kroll was, with Lamb, one of the first (including Victor Weisskopf and his student Bruce French) to calculate the relativistic Lamb shift (after Hans Bethe made a rough, non-relativistic estimate for it). This work was part of the pioneering efforts that led to the QED formalism developed by Richard Feynman, Julian Schwinger, and Sin-Itiro Tomonaga.

Kroll became at Columbia an assistant professor in 1949 and was promoted to associate professor and then full professor before leaving for UCSD.

In the academic year 1955–1956 he was a Sloan Fellow and a Guggenheim Fellow at the University of Rome. He was elected in 1974 to the National Academy of Sciences. He was a Fellow of the American Academy of Arts and Sciences and a Fellow of the American Physical Society. Among his doctoral students are Robert Mills and Eyvind Wichmann.

In 1960–1981 he was a member of the JASON Defense Advisory Group.

Upon his death, Kroll was survived by his wife, four children, and nine grandchildren.

Selected publications
with Lamb: 
with Karplus: 
with Malvin A. Ruderman: 
with Walter Wada: 
with Eyvind H. Wichmann: 

with Tsung-Dao Lee and Bruno Zumino: 
with Kenneth M. Watson: 
with Marvin Douglas: 
with Philip L. Morton and Marshall N. Rosenbluth:

References

External links
Oral history interview with Norman Myles Kroll on 28 June 1986, American Institute of Physics, Niels Bohr Library & Archives - interview conducted in La Jolla, California

1922 births
2004 deaths
20th-century American physicists
Theoretical physicists
Columbia University alumni
Columbia University faculty
University of California, San Diego faculty
Sloan Research Fellows
American people of German descent
Fellows of the American Physical Society
Members of the United States National Academy of Sciences
Rice University alumni